Permanent Vacation is a 1980 film directed, written and produced by Jim Jarmusch. It was the director's first release, and was shot on 16 mm film shortly after he dropped out of film school.

Premise
The main character, an alienated troubled hipster (Chris Parker), wanders around a dingy New York atmosphere and is confronted by a number of intriguing characters as he ponders the questions of life and searches for a better place.

Cast
 Chris Parker (Allie)
 Richard Boes (War vet)
 Ruth Bolton (Mother)
 Sara Driver (Nurse)
 María Duval (Latin girl)
 Frankie Faison (Man in lobby)
 Jane Fire (Nurse)
 Suzanne Fletcher (Girl in car)
 Leila Gastil (Leila)
 Chris Hameon (French traveller)
 John Lurie (Sax player)
 Eric Mitchell (Car fence)
 Lisa Rosen (Popcorn girl)
 Felice Rosser (Woman by mailbox)
 Evelyn Smith (Patient)
 Charlie Spademan (Patient)

Reception
It currently receives a weighted average score of 69 out of 100 on Metacritic based on 4 critic reviews, indicating "generally favorable reviews".

Vincent Canby proclaimed this film as a "must-see for anyone who shares the belief that Mr. Jarmusch is the most arresting and original American film maker to come out of the 1980s". Eric Eidelstein of IndieWire called it "a touching vision of what it was like to be head over heels with art, love, and oneself in late 1970s New York".

Soundtrack

Up There in Orbit - Written and performed by Earl Bostic
My Boyfriend's Back - Written by Bob Feldman, Jerry Goldstein, and Richard Gottehrer, performed by The Angels
Sally, Go 'Round the Roses - Written by Zell Sanders and Abner Spector, performed by The Jaynetts

Availability
The film was released by the Criterion Collection as a special feature on the DVD for Jarmusch's Stranger than Paradise on September 4, 2007.

The film was released on DVD and Blu-ray formats in the United Kingdom via Soda Pictures on March 23, 2015.

References in culture 

 A frame from the film was used on the cover of Velvet Rye's EP "Revol".

References

External links
 
 Permanent Vacation on Rotten Tomatoes

 Permanent Vacation on The Criterion Channel

1980 films
1980 drama films
Films directed by Jim Jarmusch
Films set in New York City
American drama films
Films about vacationing
1980 directorial debut films
1981 drama films
1981 films
Films shot in 16 mm film
1980s English-language films
1980s American films